
Gmina Czyżew is an urban-rural gmina (administrative district) in Wysokie Mazowieckie County, Podlaskie Voivodeship, in north-eastern Poland.

Prior to 2011 it was a rural gmina and was called Gmina Czyżew-Osada, with its seat in the village of Czyżew-Osada (now part of the town of Czyżew, which was created on 1 January 2011).

Villages
Apart from the town of Czyżew, the gmina contains the villages and settlements of Brulino-Koski, Brulino-Piwki, Czyżew Kościelny, Czyżew Ruś-Kolonia, Czyżew Ruś-Wieś, Czyżew-Chrapki, Czyżew-Pociejewo, Czyżew-Siedliska, Czyżew-Sutki, Dąbrowa Wielka, Dąbrowa-Cherubiny, Dąbrowa-Kity, Dąbrowa-Michałki, Dąbrowa-Nowa Wieś, Dąbrowa-Szatanki, Dmochy-Glinki, Dmochy-Mrozy, Dmochy-Rodzonki, Dmochy-Wochy, Dmochy-Wypychy, Godlewo-Kolonia, Godlewo-Piętaki, Jaźwiny-Koczoty, Kaczyn-Herbasy, Krzeczkowo-Gromadzyn, Krzeczkowo-Mianowskie, Krzeczkowo-Nowe Bieńki, Krzeczkowo-Stare Bieńki, Krzeczkowo-Szepielaki, Michałowo Wielkie, Ołdaki-Magna Brok, Rosochate Kościelne, Rosochate Nartołty, Siennica-Klawy, Siennica-Lipusy, Siennica-Pietrasze, Siennica-Święchy, Siennica-Szymanki, Stare Zalesie, Stary Kaczyn, Stokowo-Szerszenie, Święck-Strumiany, Szulborze-Kozy, Zalesie-Stefanowo, Zaręby-Bindugi, Zaręby-Góry Leśne, Zaręby-Skórki and Zaręby-Święchy.

Neighbouring gminas
Gmina Czyżew is bordered by the gminas of Andrzejewo, Boguty-Pianki, Klukowo, Nur, Szepietowo, Szulborze Wielkie, Wysokie Mazowieckie and Zambrów.

References

Polish official population figures 2006

Czyzew
Wysokie Mazowieckie County